Thyrocopa kea is a moth of the family Xyloryctidae. It was first described by Matthew J. Medeiros in 2009. It is endemic to the Hawaiian island of Kauai.

The length of the forewings is 12–20 mm. Adults are on wing at least from March to November. The ground color of the forewings is shiny white to mottled white and gray. There are no other markings present and the fringe is minimal. The underside of the wing is mostly dark brownish gray. The hindwings are white, to very light brownish white mottled with gray. The fringe is sometimes lighter.

External links

Thyrocopa
Endemic moths of Hawaii
Moths described in 2009